Compass High School is a public charter high school in Tucson, Arizona, founded in 2001. The school was founded by Debbie and John Ferguson and is currently operated by her children, with her son, Kerk Ferguson as the active Director and Manager of the school's operations.

Ratings 

 34% graduation rate (state average 79%)
 19% performance in the Arizona's Measurement of Educational Readiness for reading (state average 42%)
 top 75% of all schools nationally
 top 58.82% of arizona high schools
 top 54.68% of tucson metro area high schools
 top 56.97% of charter high schools

References

External links
Compass High School website
US news report
Great schools

Public high schools in Arizona
Charter schools in Arizona
Schools in Pima County, Arizona